Thief is a 1981 American neo-noir heist action thriller film directed and written by Michael Mann in his feature film debut. Based on the 1975 novel The Home Invaders: Confessions of a Cat Burglar by Frank Hohimer, the film stars James Caan in the title role, a professional safecracker trying to escape his life of crime, and Tuesday Weld as his wife. The supporting cast includes James Belushi, Robert Prosky, Dennis Farina (in his film debut), and Willie Nelson. The original musical score was composed and performed by Tangerine Dream, with additional music composed by Craig Safan.

Plot 
Frank is a jewel thief and ex-convict who has a set structure to his life. With a pair of successful Chicago businesses (a bar and a car dealership) as fronts for his criminal enterprise, Frank sets out to fulfill the missing part of his life vision: a family with Jessie, a cashier he has begun dating.

After taking down a major diamond score, Frank gives the diamonds to his fence, Joe Gags. However, before Frank can collect his share, Gags is murdered for skimming from the mob's collection money. Barry, Frank's friend and associate making the pick-up, discovers that a plating company executive Gags was working for, Attaglia, is responsible for Gags' murder and stealing Frank's payoff. In a confrontation at Attaglia's plating company, Frank demands his money back.

This leads to a meeting with Attaglia's employer Leo, a high-level fence and Chicago Outfit boss. Unknown to Frank, Leo has been receiving Frank's goods from Gags for some time. Leo admires Frank's eye for quality stolen goods and professionalism, and wants him working directly for him, offering Frank large profits. Their meeting is monitored from a distance by police surveillance.

Frank is initially reluctant, not wanting the added exposure or complications, but later that night, a conversation with Jessie changes his mind when she agrees to be part of his life, after he relates a tale of prison survival via a toughened mental attitude. Frank now agrees to do just one big score for Leo, telling Barry that this will be their last job. After being rejected at the state adoption agency, with Leo's help Frank is able to acquire a baby boy on the black market, whom he names David after his late mentor, nicknamed Okla.

After resisting a shakedown from a group of corrupt police detectives, and then subsequently ditching their surveillance, Frank and his crew are involved in a large-scale diamond heist organized by Leo. All goes well with Frank's "burn job" and he is expecting the agreed-upon sum of $830,000 for the unmounted stones with a wholesale value $4 million. But when Frank returns from the job, Leo gives him less than $100,000. This is all that Frank will receive in cash according to Leo, who says he invested the rest of Frank's cut in shopping centers in Fort Worth, Texas and Dallas, Texas, an idea Frank had previously rejected. In addition, Leo sets up a Palm Beach score for Frank in six weeks without consulting him. Frank tells Leo that their deal is over and takes the cash as he leaves, demanding the rest of his money in 24 hours.

Frank drives to his car lot, unaware that Leo's henchmen have already beaten and captured Barry and are waiting to ambush him. Frank is knocked out and Barry is killed by Carl, one of Leo's enforcers. Frank awakens with Leo staring down at him, surrounded by his henchmen. Leo informs him that he, Jessie, their child, and everything he owns are Leo's property. He threatens Frank's family if he does not continue working for him. Leo warns Frank to focus on his responsibilities. When Frank returns home, he orders an uncomprehending Jessie out of their house, telling her their marriage is over, that she must immediately leave, and that he will not be joining her. Frank instructs an associate to drive her, the baby, and $410,000 in cash to somewhere where they cannot be located.

With nothing to lose, Frank blows up their home using high-explosive charges. He then drives to his business establishments and does likewise. Armed with a pistol, he quietly breaks into Leo's house in a peaceful neighborhood and pistol whips Attaglia in the kitchen. Frank hunts for Leo, killing him in the living room. Frank then pursues Attaglia as he tries to escape from the house, but is confronted in the front yard by Carl and another henchman. In the ensuing gunfight, Frank is shot, but manages to kill the trio. Frank loosens what appears to be a bulletproof vest he was wearing beneath his jacket, and walks away into the night.

Cast

 James Caan as Frank
 Tuesday Weld as Jessie
 Willie Nelson as David 'Okla' Bertinneau
 James Belushi as Barry
 Robert Prosky as Leo
 Tom Signorelli as Attaglia
 Dennis Farina as Carl
 Nick Nickeas as Nick
 W.R. Bill Brown as Mitch
 Norm Tobin as Guido
 William Petersen as Katz & Jammer Bartender
 John Santucci as Sergeant Urizzi
 Gavin MacFadyen as Detective Boreksco
 Chuck Adamson as Detective Ancell
 Sam Cirone as Detective Martello
 Spero Anast as Detective Bukowski
 Hal Frank as Joe 'Gags'
 Patti Ross as Marie
 Del Close as Mechanic #1

Production 
Thief marked the feature film debut of Michael Mann as director, screenwriter and executive producer, after five years in television drama.

Mann made his directorial debut with the TV film The Jericho Mile. This was partly shot in Folsom Prison. Mann says that influenced the writing of Thief:
It probably informed my ability to imagine what Frank's life was like, where he was from, and what those 12 or 13 years in prison were like for him.. The idea of creating his character, was to have somebody who has been outside of society. An outsider who has been removed from the evolution of everything from technology to the music that people listen to, to how you talk to a girl, to what do you want with your life and how do you go about getting it. Everything that's normal development, that we experience, he was excluded from, by design. In the design of the character and the engineering of the character, that was the idea.
Mann made James Caan do research as a thief for his role, and said:
I always find it interesting, people who are aware, alert, conscious of what they do and are pretty good at it…  People who want to put in 50-60 hours a week and go home and are not really conscious of life moving by, don't really interest me very much... As part of the curriculum designed for an actor getting into character, I try to imagine what's going to really help bring this actor more fully into character. And so I try to imagine what experiences are going to make more dimensional his intake of Frank, so that he is Frank spontaneously when I'm shooting. So one of the most obvious things is it'd be pretty good if [James Caan] was as good at doing what Frank does as is Frank.
Jerry Bruckheimer and Ronnie Caan served as the film's producers.

James Caan's emotional several-minute monologue with Weld in a coffee shop is often cited as the film's high point, and Caan has long considered the scene his favorite of his career. The actor liked the movie although he found the part challenging to play. "I like to be emotionally available but this guy is available to nothing."

Being Michael Mann's feature film directorial debut, Thief showcases many of the cinematic techniques that would later become his trademarks. Chief among these is the cinematography, utilizing light and shadow to give the proceedings, especially those taking place in the darkness of night, a sense of danger. The film also earns plaudits for its meticulous attention to detail: the tools and techniques of the trade, right down to the oxy lance used to penetrate a safe, are authentic, the result of Mann's decision to hire real-life thieves to serve as technical advisers.

Thief marks the first film appearance of actors Dennis Farina, William Petersen, James Belushi and Robert Prosky. At the time a Chicago police officer, Farina appears as a henchman. Conversely, John Santucci, who plays the role of corrupt cop Urizzi, was a recently paroled thief and acted as a technical adviser on the film. In 1986, Farina and Santucci both were cast in Mann's TV series Crime Story, Farina as a Chicago police lieutenant and Santucci as a jewel thief. Petersen, who later would star (along with Farina) in the Mann film Manhunter, appears briefly as a barman at a club. The influential Chicago improv teacher Del Close has a brief appearance as a mechanic, in a scene that was improvised with the other mechanic actors.
 
Mann originally intended to score the music with Chicago blues music. He said, "However, I felt that what the film was saying, thematically, and the facility with which the film might be able to have resonance with audience. I felt that to be so regionally specific in the music choice would make Frank's experience specific only to Frank. So I wanted the kind of transparency, if you like, the formality of electronic music, and hence Tangerine Dream."

Originally titled Violent Streets, the film debuted at the 34th Cannes Film Festival. It went on to open in theaters in the United States on March 27, 1981, earning a modest $4.3 million. While not a financial success in its initial release, the film has become a reference point in Mann's career, especially with the release of his crime epic, Heat, with which this movie has many similarities.

The still of Frank holding a gun on Attaglia as he attempts to recover his money in an early scene was used for one of the movie's posters.

Near the end of the film, Frank destroys his house. The film company built a false front onto a real house and attempted to destroy it with explosives. The explosions severely damaged the real house, however, leading to its demolition.

Music

Mann has gained a reputation as a director who uses cutting-edge music for his films. Thiefs moody soundscapes were composed and performed by Tangerine Dream, and was their second of many notable film scores composed by the group throughout the 1980s. The film was nominated for a Razzie Award for Worst Musical Score, but that didn't deter Mann from choosing them a second time to compose the music for his next feature film, the ill-fated 1983 WW II fantasy horror The Keep.

Mann stated that he was always a jazz and blues fan and wanted to use that style of music for the film. He made a director's decision to use Tangerine Dream to showcase the style and themes of the film better than blues might have. He utilizes jazz/blues in one scene when Frank races to meet Jessie after the offer from Leo, transitioning from the meetup, all the way to the jazz club.

Reception
The movie received widespread critical acclaim. It holds a 79% rating on review site Rotten Tomatoes, based on 80 reviews, with an average rating of 7.6/10. The consensus states: "Thiefs enigmatic conclusion will rob some audiences of satisfaction, but it's an authentic and sleekly rendered neo-noir, powered by a swaggering James Caan at the peak of his charisma."

Roger Ebert described Thief as "one of the most intelligent thrillers I've seen" and gave the film 3½ out of 4 stars, writing that the film's only major flaw was a failure to develop the subplot featuring Willie Nelson's character more fully: 
"Willie has played the character so well that we wanted more."

See also
Heist film

References

External links
 
 
 
 
 
 Thief: Where Nothing Means Nothing an essay by Nick James at the Criterion Collection

1981 films
1981 action thriller films
1981 directorial debut films
1980s crime thriller films
1980s English-language films
1980s heist films
American action thriller films
American crime thriller films
American gangster films
American heist films
American neo-noir films
Films based on American crime novels
Films directed by Michael Mann
Films produced by Jerry Bruckheimer
Films scored by Tangerine Dream
Films set in Chicago
Films shot in Chicago
Films with screenplays by Michael Mann
United Artists films
1980s American films